Sayyed Mohammad Hosseini (born January 7, 1995) is an Iranian football defender who currently plays for Tractor in the Persian Gulf Pro League.

Club career

Naft Masjed Soleyman
He made his debut for Naft Masjed Soleyman in 8th fixtures of 2018–19 Persian Gulf Pro League against Sepahan.

References

Living people
1995 births
People from Dogonbadan
Association football defenders
Iranian footballers
Fajr Sepasi players
Naft Masjed Soleyman F.C. players
Esteghlal Khuzestan players
Machine Sazi F.C. players
Havadar S.C. players
Esteghlal F.C. players
Tractor S.C. players
Persian Gulf Pro League players